The Bloor Street Culture Corridor  is a cluster of arts and cultural organizations in Toronto, Ontario, Canada. It is located on Bloor Street West, between Bathurst and Yonge streets.

The corridor has a wide variety of art genres, from museum experiences to films, art exhibitions to music concerts. The area also is culturally diverse, including Aboriginal, French, Jewish, Italian, Japanese, Estonian, African and Caribbean arts and culture.

Officially launched in April 2014, the collective shares a website, social media and a mobile app to promote exhibitions at its member institutions. In 2016, the corridor was successful in working with the Toronto municipal government to have the section of Bloor Street West designated an official City of Toronto cultural corridor. Each year more than three million persons visit the corridor's arts and culture destinations, and attend exhibitions, performances, and events. Together, the Bloor Street Culture Corridor organizations employ more than 5,500 culture workers and generate more than $629,500,000 in economic impact each year.

Members
Bloor St. Culture Corridor Partner Destinations

 Alliance Française de Toronto
 Bata Shoe Museum
 A Different Booklist Cultural Centre
 Hot Docs Ted Rogers Cinema
 Gardiner Museum
 Istituto Italiano di Cultura
 The Japan Foundation, Toronto
 Miles Nadal Jewish Community Centre
 Museum of Estonians Abroad (VEMU)
 Native Canadian Centre of Toronto
 Randolph Centre for the Arts
 The Royal Conservatory of Music / Koerner Hall
 Royal Ontario Museum (ROM) 
 Soundstreams 
 Tafelmusik Baroque Orchestra and Chamber Choir
 The Toronto Consort
 Toronto Reference Library 
 University of Toronto, Faculty of Music
 918 Bathurst Centre for Culture, Arts, Media + Education

References

External links
 Bloor St. Culture Corridor

Neighbourhoods in Toronto
Arts districts
Culture of Toronto